Awake is the second studio album by American rock band Godsmack, released on October 31, 2000. It features the song "Goin' Down", which first appeared on the band's first studio recording, All Wound Up. This was the only Godsmack album to feature drummer Tommy Stewart.

During the 2000s, the songs "Sick of Life" and "Awake" were used for the United States Navy's "Accelerate Your Life" recruiting advertisements.

Recording
The band opted to convert a warehouse in Haverhill, Massachusetts into a makeshift studio, rather than use a more traditional studio setting. According to Sully Erna, the band just did not want to move into any luxurious studio, because they wanted to keep the edge on for writing and "not get too far away from what we're all about". So they just stayed in the slums rather than moving into luxury.

Erna says the results show in the music's "tougher" sound; "however, it has a very raw edge to it. It's not very polished," he says. "But it still has a lot of good grooves, and it still has a lot of power."

The band also kept in touch with its roots by working some older unreleased material. The album includes older songs that just missed being on the debut. "Goin' Down" is a track from the original Godsmack album that was dropped in favor of "Whatever" for the major-label release. The songs "Bad Magick" and "Vampires" also date back to the same period.

Release
Awake debuted at number five on the Billboard 200, selling 256,000 copies in its first week, and the album would go on to sell at least 2,000,000 copies in the United States.

Since its release, the album's title track dominated rock radio and broke chart records throughout 2000 and 2001. The album's spoken word track "Vampires" earned the band its first Grammy nomination. In 2001, Awake won the Boston Music Award for Album of the Year. "Greed" earned the band Boston Music Awards nominations for single and video of the year.

Track listing

Personnel

Godsmack
Sully Erna – vocals, rhythm guitar, drums
Tony Rombola – lead guitar, backing vocals
Robbie Merrill – bass
Tommy Stewart – drums

Additional performances
Katrina Chester – vocals on "The Journey" and "Spiral"

Production
Produced by Sully Erna and Murdock
Engineered by Mudrock, except "Vampires", recorded by Cameron Webb
Additional engineering by Nate Dube
Mixed by Mudrock, except "Mistakes" and "Goin' Down" (mixed by Mudrock and Jay Baumgardner), and "Vampires" and "Bad Magick" (mixed by Jay Baumgardner)
Mastered by Ted Jensen
Photography by Clay Patrick McBride and Ian Barrett

Charts

Weekly charts

Year-end charts

Singles

Certifications

Release history

References

2000 albums
Godsmack albums
Republic Records albums